John Harry Robert Timpson,  (2 July 1928 – 19 November 2005) was a British journalist, best known as a radio presenter.

Early life
Born at Ridgeholme, 53 The Ridgeway, Kenton, Middlesex, he was educated at Merchant Taylors' School, a boys' independent school in Northwood, London.

Career
On leaving school he went straight into employment at the Wembley News as a sixteen-year-old cub reporter. After five years there and two years of national service in the Royal Army Service Corps, he married his wife Patricia née Whale in 1951 and moved to Norfolk. He  then worked for the Eastern Daily Press until, in 1959, he started to work for BBC News as reporter, becoming deputy court correspondent in 1962 covering overseas royal visits. He remained in this post until 1967.

From 1964, he presented Newsroom on BBC 2, the first British television news programme to make the switch to colour on 1 July 1967. He later presented the BBC's late evening Tonight programme.

Timpson co-presented the BBC Radio 4 programme Today from 1970 to 1976 and again from 1978 to 1986, working on Tonight during the gap. Initially appointed to steady a programme affected by the erratic Jack de Manio, he later presented in tandem with Robert Robinson and Brian Redhead among others, forming a popular partnership with the latter. Timpson became known as the more humorous of the two men with jocular asides like "Insulation – Britain lags behind" or "Crash course for learner drivers".

From 1984 to 1987, he also presented the popular weekly radio show Any Questions?. He was generally perceived as something of a small-c conservative traditionalist and probably politically to the right of his colleague Brian Redhead.

His experiences in broadcasting provided Timpson with material for several books: Today and Yesterday (1976), The Lighter Side of Today (1983) and The Early Morning Book (1986). After his retirement from the BBC he returned to Norfolk and continued writing, especially about England and East Anglia in particular. These included a novel Paper Trail (1989) and two works on the quirks and oddities of English life – Timpson's England (1987) and Timpson's Towns (1989). Subsequent books included Timpson’s English Eccentrics (1991), Timpson’s English Villages (1992), Timpson’s Other England (1993), Timpson’s English Country Inns (1995) and Timpson on the Verge (2002).

The station building at County School in central Norfolk was formally opened as a heritage railway centre by John Timpson on 15 June 1990, who was brought into the station for the occasion on a short train composed of a Ruston diesel locomotive and LMS brake van.

In 1986 he was awarded a Sony Gold Award for outstanding services to radio, and the following year he was awarded an OBE for his services to broadcasting.

Death
John Timpson died in King's Lynn, Norfolk, on 19 November 2005 and was buried at his parish church of  St Peter's Weasenham. He was survived by his wife and son, although his second son Nick had predeceased him by only five weeks. A memorial service was held on 22 February 2006, when family, friends and colleagues gathered at Norwich Cathedral to celebrate his long and productive life and career. The speakers included the Director of BBC Radio and Music, Jenny Abramsky.

References

External links 
 

1928 births
2005 deaths
Alumni of the University of Nottingham
BBC newsreaders and journalists
British male journalists
British radio personalities
British radio people
People educated at Merchant Taylors' School, Northwood
Officers of the Order of the British Empire
People from Kenton, London
Royal Army Service Corps soldiers
20th-century British Army personnel